William Crump may refer to:
 William Crump (Texas politician) (1809/10–1889), first Speaker of the Texas House of Representatives
 William Crump (MP),  English politician, MP for Canterbury
 William Crump (diplomat), U.S. Chargé d'Affaires to Chile (1845–1847)
 William Crump (gardener), 19th-century British horticulturalist
 William Crump, an apple (Cox's Orange Pippin x Worcester Pearmain) named for the horticulturalist
 Bill Crump (1903–1995), Anglican bishop in Canada
 Bill Crump (cricketer) (1928–2022), New Zealand cricketer
 William Wood Crump (1819–1897), Virginia lawyer and politician